Syangboche Airport  is a domestic airport located in Namche Bazaar  serving Solukhumbu District, a district in Province No. 1 in Nepal. The airstrip is the closest airstrip to Mount Everest and Everest Base Camp. However, it is not often used by those going to either as this is generally not viewed as consistent with safe, reasonably paced elevation acclimatization.  Rather, typical users of this airstrip are tourists who plan on visiting a nearby hotel and going no higher or those who plan only on going to Namche Bazaar.

History
The airport was constructed in 1971 by a team led by Takashi Miyahara and was opened with a test flight by Royal Nepal Airlines on June 1, 1973. It was built to serve , at the time the highest-placed hotel in the world.

In the early 2000s, there was a controversy surrounding the expansion of the airport for tourists to skip the trek from Lukla to Namche Bazaar with Lukla entrepreneurs fearing loss of business. However, the plans for expansion never materialized.

Facilities

The airstrip is not licensed for commercial operations and has few facilities. There are no scheduled services and most aircraft landing and departing at Syangboche are helicopters and STOL aircraft making chartered flights from Kathmandu or Lukla. The flight from Lukla to Syangboche takes between 7 and 11 minutes by helicopter. Lukla was previously the furthest point served by scheduled flights on the way to Mount Everest.

Helicopters do fly further, and higher, up to Everest Base Camp, but only for picking up exhausted or injured mountaineers or dropping critical supplies. Without altitude acclimatization, Syangboche is the highest point it is advisable to reach by aircraft. It is not uncommon for people visiting Syangboche to be out of breath, due to the high altitude.

Airlines and destinations

Currently, there are no scheduled services to and from Syangboche Airport. Previously Nepal Airlines and Tara Air operated routes to Kathmandu.

References

Airports in Nepal
1971 establishments in Nepal